Polymetme thaeocoryla is a species of fish in the family Phosichthyidae (lightfish).

Its specific name is an anagram of the similar species, Polymetme corythaeola. It has no common name in English, but in Spanish is called luciérnaga musculosa ("muscular lightfish") and in French luisant grand feu ("gleaming [fish of] great fire").

Description

Polymetme thaeocoryla has a dark dorsum, with silver flanks and a black pigment on the outer caudal rays. Its length is maximum . It has 12 or 13 dorsal soft rays, 30–34 anal soft rays, 44 or 45 vertebrae, 7 or 8 pyloric caeca and 17–19 photophores above the anal fin.

Habitat

Behaviour
Nothing is known of its early life stages.

References

Platytroctidae
Fish described in 1990
Taxa named by Nikolai Vasilyevich Parin
Taxa named by Oksana Dmitrievna Borodulina